The Armadillo class of tankers was a class of Type Z-ET1-S-C3 Liberty T1 tanker type, that were commissioned into the United States Navy.  They were given the hull classification symbols of unclassified miscellaneous vessels.

This group of Liberty based tankers all served in the United States Navy during the Second World War.  Each ship was commissioned in late 1943, and decommissioned in the summer of 1946.  These ships primarily served in the Asian-Pacific theater of the war.  These ships brought aviation gasoline to remote islands in the south Pacific, required for the many aerial reconnaissance missions there.

Notable incident
  sank due to an enemy kamikaze attack on 30 December 1944 at Mangarin Bay, Leyte, Philippines.

References

 
Auxiliary ship classes of the United States Navy